Chelodina is a suborder of polyplacophoran mollusc that appeared during the Cambrian and became extinct during the Cretaceous. It is known from fossils from Europe and North America.

References 

Prehistoric chitons
Mollusc suborders
Fossil taxa described in 1960